Kenneth Upchurch (born June 4, 1969) is an insurance agent with Upchurch Insurance and Financial services. He was the owner publisher of the Monticello Stage, a community newspaper in Monticello in Wayne County, Kentucky, who is a Republican member of the Kentucky House of Representatives from District 52, which encompasses Wayne, McCreary, and a portion of Pulaski counties in the south-central portion of the state. Upchurch held this seat from January 1999 to December 2010 and then returned after a two-year hiatus to the position early in 2013.

Upchurch is a son of Martin L. Upchurch of Monticello and the former Barbara Jackson (1948–2013). He and his wife, Melissa, have a daughter, Chelsea Nelson Thompson and a son Jackson. He has two brothers, Keith Upchurch of Monticello and Timothy Upchurch of Lexington, Kentucky. His maternal grandfather is the Reverend James Howard Jackson of Mt. Orab, Ohio. Upchurch received a Bachelor of Arts in political science from Eastern Kentucky University. At EKU, he was the student body president and an automatic member of the university board of regents. He is a member of the Elk Spring Valley Baptist Church in Monticello.

In his first race for the House, buoyed by a large vote in Wayne County, Upchurch won the Republican nomination over three opponents by a margin of some seven hundred votes. In the general election, he defeated Democrat Arthur J. Bolze of Somerset by a wide margin, 8,505 (75.7 percent) to 2,736 (24.3 percent) As a legislator, Upchurch developed a reputation for his support of small business and agriculture. In 2002, his colleagues elected him as the House Republican whip, a position which he filled for two terms and helped to craft the state budget. He did not seek a seventh two-year term in 2010 and was succeeded by fellow Republican, Sara Beth Gregory, a lawyer from Monticello. Instead Upchurch was defeated in a bid for Wayne County Judge-Executive. After just two years in the state House, Gregory won a special election to the Kentucky State Senate in December 2012 to succeed long-term State Senate President David L. Williams of Burkesville in Cumberland County. Upchurch won back the seat that he had vacated barely two years earlier, when he defeated Democrat Harvey Shearer, also of Monticello in a low-turnout special election held on February 12, 2013. The leadership of both parties selected Upchurch and Shearer as their nominees.

References

1969 births
Living people
Businesspeople from Kentucky
American newspaper publishers (people)
Republican Party members of the Kentucky House of Representatives
People from Richmond, Kentucky
People from Monticello, Kentucky
Eastern Kentucky University alumni
Baptists from Kentucky
21st-century American politicians